The FIFA Women's World Cup is an international association football competition contested by the senior women's national teams of the members of Fédération Internationale de Football Association (FIFA), the sport's international governing body. The competition has been held every four years and one year after the men's FIFA World Cup since 1991, when the inaugural tournament, then called the FIFA Women's World Championship, was held in China. Under the tournament's current format, national teams vie for 31 slots in a three-year qualification phase. The host nation's team is automatically entered as the 32nd slot. The tournament, called the World Cup Finals, is contested at venues within the host nation(s) over a period of about one month.

The eight FIFA Women's World Cup tournaments have been won by four national teams. The United States have won four times, and are the current champions after winning it at the 2019 tournament in France. The other winners are Germany, with two titles, and Japan and Norway with one title each.

Six countries have hosted the Women's World Cup. China and the United States have each hosted the tournament twice, while Canada, France, Germany, and Sweden have each hosted it once. 

Australia and New Zealand will host the competition in 2023, making it the first edition to be held in the Southern Hemisphere, the first Women's World Cup to be hosted by two countries, and the first FIFA senior competition for either men or women to be held across two confederations.

Format

Qualification

Qualifying tournaments are held within the six FIFA continental zones (Africa, Asia, North and Central America and Caribbean, South America, Oceania, Europe), and are organised by their respective confederations: Confederation of African Football (CAF), Asian Football Confederation (AFC), Confederation of North, Central America, and Caribbean Association Football (CONCACAF), South American Football Confederation (CONMEBOL), Oceania Football Confederation (OFC), and Union of European Football Associations (UEFA). For each tournament, FIFA decides beforehand the number of berths awarded to each of the continental zones, based on the relative strength of the confederations' teams. The hosts of the World Cup receive an automatic berth in the finals. With the exception of the UEFA, other confederations organise its qualification campaign throughout continental tournaments. Since the 2015 FIFA Women's World Cup, the number of finalists increased from 16 to 24 and now 32.

Final tournament
The final tournament has featured between 12 and 24 national teams competing over about one month in the host nation(s). There are two stages: the group stage followed by the knockout stage.

In the group stage, teams are drawn into groups of four teams each. Each group plays a round-robin tournament, in which each team is scheduled for three matches against other teams in the same group. The last round of matches of each group is scheduled at the same time to preserve fairness among all four teams. In the 2015 24-team format, the two teams finishing first and second in each group and the four best teams among those ranked third qualified for the round of 16, also called the knockout stage. Points are used to rank the teams within a group. Since 1994, three points have been awarded for a win, one for a draw and none for a loss (before, winners received two points).

The ranking of each team in each group is determined as follows:
 Greatest number of points in group matches
 Greatest goal difference in group matches
 Greatest number of goals scored in group matches
 If more than one team remain level after applying the above criteria, their ranking will be determined as follows:
 Greatest number of points in head-to-head matches among those teams
 Greatest goal difference in head-to-head matches among those teams
 Greatest number of goals scored in head-to-head matches among those teams
 If any of the teams above remain level after applying the above criteria, their ranking will be determined by the drawing of lots

The knockout stage is a single-elimination tournament in which teams play each other in one-off matches, with extra time and penalty shootouts used to decide the winners if necessary. It begins with the round of 16. This is followed by the quarter-finals, semi-finals, the third-place match (contested by the losing semi-finalists), and the final.

History

The first instance of a Women's World Cup dates back to 1970 in Italy, with the first tournament of that name taking place in July 1970. This was followed by another unofficial World Cup tournament in Mexico in 1971, in which Denmark won the title after defeating Mexico, 3–0, in the final at the Azteca Stadium. In the 1980s, the Mundialito was held in Italy across four editions with both Italy and England winning two titles.

Several countries lifted bans on women's football in the 1970s, leading to new teams being established in many countries. After official continental women's tournaments were held in Asia in 1975 and Europe in 1984, Ellen Wille declared that she wanted better effort from the FIFA Congress in promoting the women's game. This came in the form of the 1988 FIFA Women's Invitation Tournament in China as a test to see if a global women's World Cup was feasible. Twelve national teams took part in the competition – four from UEFA, three from AFC, two from CONCACAF, and one each from CONMEBOL, CAF and OFC. After the opening match of the tournament between China and Canada was attended by 45,000 people, the tournament was deemed a success, with crowds averaging 20,000. Norway, who was the European champion, defeated Sweden, 1–0, in the final, while Brazil clinched third place by beating the hosts in a penalty shootout. The competition was deemed a success and on 30 June FIFA approved the establishment of an official World Cup, which was to take place in 1991 again in China. Again, twelve teams competed, this time culminating in the United States defeating Norway in the final, 2–1, with Michelle Akers scoring two goals.

The 1995 edition in Sweden saw the experiment of a time-out concept throughout the tournament which was later tightened mid-tournament to only occur after a break in play. The time-out only appeared in the one tournament which saw it scrapped. The final of the 1995 edition saw Norway, who scored 17 goals in the group stage, defeat Germany, 2–0, to capture their only title.
In the 1999 edition, one of the most famous moments of the tournament was American defender Brandi Chastain's victory celebration after scoring the Cup-winning penalty kick against China. She took off her jersey and waved it over her head (as men frequently do) as she celebrated. The 1999 final in the Rose Bowl in Pasadena, California, had an attendance of 90,185.

The 1999 and 2003 Women's World Cups were both held in the United States; in 2003 China was supposed to host it, but the tournament was moved because of SARS. As compensation, China retained their automatic qualification to the 2003 tournament as host nation, and was automatically chosen to host the 2007 FIFA Women's World Cup. Germany hosted the 2011 FIFA Women's World Cup, as decided by vote in October 2007. In March 2011, FIFA awarded Canada the right to host the 2015 FIFA Women's World Cup. The 2015 competition saw the field expand from 16 to 24 teams.

During the 2015 FIFA Women's World Cup, both Formiga of Brazil and Homare Sawa of Japan appeared in their record sixth World Cup, a feat that had never been achieved before by either female or male players. Christie Pearce is the oldest player to ever play in a Women's World Cup match, at the age of 40 years. In March 2015, FIFA awarded France the right to host the 2019 FIFA Women's World Cup over South Korea.

In the 2019 edition, which was held in France, the United States won the tournament for the fourth time.

In 2023, Australia and New Zealand will be hosting the FIFA Women's World Cup for the first time as joint hosts, and the number of participants will be expanded from 24 to 32. It will be also the first tournament to be held in the Southern Hemisphere. With Australia and New Zealand respectively being members of the Asian Football Confederation and Oceania Football Confederation, this will be the first FIFA senior competition to be hosted across two confederations.

Trophy
The current trophy was designed in 1998 for the 1999 tournament, and takes the form of a spiral band, enclosing a football at the top, that aims to capture the athleticism, dynamism, and elegance of international women's football. In the 2010s, it was fitted with a cone-shaped base. Underneath the base, the name of each of the tournament's previous winners is engraved. By contrast, the men's World Cup trophy is fabricated in 18-karat gold and has a precious metal value of $150,000. However, a new Winner's Trophy is constructed for each women's champion to take home, while there is only one original men's trophy which is retained by FIFA with each men's champion taking home a replica trophy.

Since 2007, the winners are also awarded the FIFA Champions Badge, which is worn on the jerseys of the winning team until the winners of the next tournament has been decided.

Hosts

Attendance

Notes:
 The 2003 Women's World Cup was originally planned to be hosted by China, but was awarded to the United States in May 2003 after a major SARS outbreak.
 The 2015 FIFA Women's World Cup set a new attendance record for all FIFA competitions besides the men's FIFA World Cup.

Results

Notes

In all, 36 nations have played in at least one Women's World Cup. Of those, four nations have won the World Cup. With four titles, the United States is the most successful Women's World Cup team and is one of only seven nations to play in every World Cup. They have also had the most top four finishes (8), medals (8), and final appearances (5), including the longest streak of three consecutive finals in 2011, 2015, and 2019.

Teams reaching the top four

* = hosts

Best performances by confederations

, four of the six FIFA confederations have made it to a Women's World Cup final, the only exceptions being CAF (Africa) and the OFC (Oceania). CONMEBOL is the only confederation to have made a World Cup final without winning, following Brazil's defeat in the 2007 final. The farthest advancing African team was Nigeria, who were eliminated in the quarter finals in 1999. Oceania has sent two teams, Australia and New Zealand, to the World Cup, but Australia did not advance from the group stage until after the country's football association moved to the Asian Football Confederation, and New Zealand (which remains in the OFC) has never advanced to the knockout rounds.

The United States and Norway are the only teams to have won the tournament in their own confederations, with the U.S. winning in 1999 (at home) and 2015 (in Canada), and Norway in 1995 (in Sweden). The United States are also the only team that has won the tournament in every continent was played: Asia (in 1991), Europe (in 2019) and in North America (in 1999 and in 2015). Germany has won in Asia (in 2007) and in North America (in 2003), Japan has won in Europe (in 2011).

Broadcasting and revenue

, the 2015 FIFA Women's World Cup Final was the most watched soccer match in American history with nearly 23 million viewers, more than the 2015 NBA Finals and Stanley Cup. It was also the most watched Spanish-language broadcast in tournament history. More than 750 million viewers were reported to have watched the tournament worldwide.

The 2015 Women's World Cup generated almost $73 million. By comparison, the 2018 men's tournament generated an estimated $6.1 billion in revenue.

Records and statistics

Boldface indicates a player still playing.

Top goalscorers

Individual

Country

All-time table for champions

Awards

At the end of each World Cup, awards are presented to select players and teams for accomplishments other than their final team positions in the tournament.
There are currently five post-tournament awards from the FIFA Technical Study Group:
the Golden Ball  (currently commercially termed "adidas Golden Ball") for the best overall player of the tournament (first awarded in 1991);
the Golden Boot ((currently commercially termed "adidas Golden Boot", formerly known as the Golden Shoe) for the top goalscorer of the tournament (first awarded in 1991);
the Golden Glove (currently commercially termed "adidas Golden Glove", formerly known as the Best Goalkeeper) for the best goalkeeper of the tournament (first awarded in 2003);
the FIFA Young Player Award for the best player of the tournament under 21 years of age at the start of the calendar year (first awarded in 2011);
the FIFA Fair Play Trophy for the team with the best record of fair play during the tournament (first awarded in 1991).

There is currently one award voted on by fans during the tournament:
the Player of the Match (currently commercially termed "VISA Player of the Match") for outstanding performance by a player during each match of the tournament (first awarded in 2003).

There is currently one award voted on by fans after the conclusion of the tournament:
the Goal of the Tournament (currently commercially termed "Hyundai Goal of the Tournament") for the fans' best goal scored during the tournament (first awarded in 2007).

The following five awards are no longer given:
the All-Star Squad for the best squad of players of the tournament (chosen by the technical study group, awarded from 1999 to 2015);
the Most Entertaining Team for the team that entertained the fans the most during the tournament (voted on by fans after the conclusion of the tournament, awarded in 2003 and 2007);
the FANtasy All-Star Team for the fans' best eleven-player line-up of the tournament (voted on by fans after the conclusion of the tournament, awarded in 2003);
the Dream Team for the fans' best manager and eleven-player line-up of the tournament (voted on by fans after the conclusion of the tournament, awarded in 2015);
the Players Who Dared to Shine for ten key players of the tournament who "dared to shine" (chosen by the technical study group, awarded in 2019).

See also

 FIFA Women's Club World Cup
 FIFA U-20 Women's World Cup
 FIFA U-17 Women's World Cup

References

External links

  
 UEFA's page on the FIFA Women's World Cup, UEFA.com 
 Women's World Cup at the RSSSF 

 
Women's World Cup
Recurring sporting events established in 1991
Women's world championships
 Women's
Association football events